The Revolutionary Republican Party of Iran was a moderate left-wing political party in Persia with socialist reformist tendencies. It was founded in late 1925 by Iranian diaspora in Germany and published its platform in 1927.

References

1925 establishments in Germany
Defunct socialist parties in Iran
Iranian organizations based in Germany
Political parties established in 1925
Radical parties
Republican parties